The 1985 Dutch Grand Prix was a Formula One motor race held at Circuit Zandvoort on 25 August 1985. It was the eleventh round of the 1985 FIA Formula One World Championship and the 34th World Championship Grand Prix to be held in the Netherlands. The race was held over 70 laps of the four kilometre circuit for a race distance of 298 kilometres. The race also proved to be the 25th and last Grand Prix victory for triple World Champion Niki Lauda, driving a McLaren-TAG. Lauda's teammate Alain Prost was second, with Brazilian racer Ayrton Senna third in his Lotus-Renault. However, it was also to be the last Dutch Grand Prix for 36 years. It was planned to be re-introduced in 2020, on a revised Zandvoort circuit, however the re-introduction was postponed due to the COVID-19 pandemic, which would be eventually cancelled. The race eventually took take place in 2021, won by Max Verstappen.

It was also the last Grand Prix for West German Stefan Bellof, who was killed the following week at the 1000 km of Spa World Sportscar race.

Race summary 

Tambay escaped shaken but unhurt, and took the start in the spare car.

Nelson Piquet recorded his first and only pole position of the season, averaging , the first for tyre manufacturer Pirelli. However, he stalled his Brabham at the start and was eventually push-started, almost a lap behind the leaders. He eventually finished eighth.

Niki Lauda took his 25th and final Grand Prix win in his McLaren-TAG. His teammate Alain Prost finished second, only 0.232 seconds behind; the two had diced for the lead over the final twelve laps of the race. Ayrton Senna continued his late-season charge by finishing third in his Lotus, albeit 48 seconds behind the McLarens; he finished just ahead of Prost's Drivers' Championship rival Michele Alboreto in the Ferrari. Senna's teammate Elio de Angelis was fifth, with Williams' Nigel Mansell taking the final point for sixth.

Following his car destroying crash at the previous race in Austria, this was also the last time Andrea de Cesaris appeared in a Ligier. It would in fact be the Italian's last race of the season.

Classification

Qualifying

Race

Championship standings after the race

Drivers' Championship standings

Constructors' Championship standings

Note: Only the top five positions are included for both sets of standings.

References

External links

 Grand Prix Archives Video

Dutch Grand Prix
Grand Prix
Dutch Grand Prix
Dutch Grand Prix